Ormetica zenzeroides is a moth of the family Erebidae. It was described by Arthur Gardiner Butler in 1877. It is found in French Guiana, Brazil, Ecuador, Bolivia and Panama.

References

Ormetica
Moths described in 1877